The 2011 Gloucester City Council election took place on 5 May 2011 to elect members of Gloucester City Council in England. There were 11 seats for election and the Conservative Party gained control of the council from no overall control. Paul James, who had been serving as leader of the council since 2007 running a Conservative minority administration, continued to serve as leader but with his party having a majority.

Results  

|}

Ward results

Abbey

Barnwood

Barton and Tredworth

Hucclecote

Kingsholm and Wotton

Longlevens

Matson and Robinswood

Moreland

Quedgeley Fieldcourt

Quedgeley Severn Vale

Westgate

References

2011 English local elections
2011
2010s in Gloucestershire